The Takarazuka Kinen (宝塚記念) is a Grade I flat horse race in Japan for three-year-old and above thoroughbreds where they run over a distance of 2,200 metres (approximately  miles) at Hanshin Racecourse (阪神競馬場) in late June. It is one of the two "All-Star" races in Japanese horse racing; the other is the Arima Kinen (the Grand Prix) in late December.

It was first run in 1960 with a distance of 1,800 metres. From 1961 to 1965 the race was run over 2,000 metres and since 1966 it has been run over its present distance.

The race is run on the turf and is named after the city of Takarazuka, Hyōgo, the location of Hanshin Racecourse, which is the venue of the race.

As with the Arima Kinen, the majority of the runners in the field are selected by a vote from racing fans, while the remainder are determined by the amount of prizemoney won.

Winners since 1984

 * The 1991, 1995 and 2006 races took place at Kyoto Racecourse.

Earlier winners 

 1960 - Homare Hiro
 1961 - Caesar
 1962 - Kodama
 1963 - Ryu Forel
 1964 - Hikaru Pola
 1965 - Shinzan
 1966 - Eight Crown
 1967 - Taiyo
 1968 - Hikaru Takai
 1969 - Date Horai
 1970 - Speed Symboli
 1971 - Mejiro Musashi
 1972 - Shofu Midori
 1973 - Hamano Parade
 1974 - Haiseiko
 1975 - Naoki
 1976 - Fujino Parthia
 1977 - Tosho Boy
 1978 - Erimo George
 1979 - Sakura Shori
 1980 - Teru Tenryu
 1981 - Katsu R
 1982 - Monte Prince
 1983 - Hagino Kamui O

See also
 Horse racing in Japan
 List of Japanese flat horse races

References 
Racing Post: 

External links 
 Horse Racing in Japan

Open middle distance horse races
Horse races in Japan
Turf races in Japan
Breeders' Cup Challenge series